Acton Township is a township  in Walsh County, North Dakota, United States.

References

Townships in Walsh County, North Dakota
Townships in North Dakota